XHSBH-FM is a radio station on 100.9 FM in Sabinas Hidalgo, Nuevo León. The station is owned by Grupo Radio Alegría and is known as Digital 102.9, simulcasting sister station XHMG-FM in Monterrey.

History
XHSBH received its concession on November 30, 1994. The original concessionaire was Gonzalo Estrada Cruz, who founded GRA and its associated ABC newspaper.

Long known as La Sabrosita, in line with GRA's XHRK-FM 95.7 in Monterrey, the station began simulcasting pop outlet XHMG-FM 102.9 in 2020.

References

Radio stations in Nuevo León
Radio stations established in 1994
1994 establishments in Mexico